Shrink wrap is a polymer plastic film which shrinks tightly over whatever it is covering when heated, commonly used as an overwrap for packaging.

Shrink wrap may also refer to:
Shrinkwrap (contract law), a type of license agreement or other terms and conditions which can only be read and accepted by the consumer after opening the product
"Shrink Wrap", an episode of the sitcom The King of Queens
"Shrink Wrap", American TV series Dexter episode

See also
Shrink Rap (disambiguation)
Shrinkwrapped (disambiguation)
Plastic wrap
Stretch wrap